The PeeChees (aka The PeeChee All-Season Sensations) were an American punk band formed in 1994 by Lookout! Records co-owners Christopher Appelgren (The Pattern, Bumblescrump, The Lefties), Molly Neuman (Bratmobile, The Frumpies, Love or Perish), along with guitarist Carlos Cañedo (Rice, Love or Perish, Beehive & The Baracudas), and bass player Rop Vasquez (Rice, Semi-Automatic, The Lefties).
The PeeChees released three albums on the Kill Rock Stars label, and singles on Kill Rock Stars, Lookout! Records, and Subpop, and were on many compilations during the mid-1990s. They toured the United States and Europe and performed with label mates Bikini Kill, Unwound, and Sleater-Kinney and performed and collaborated with Rocket From The Crypt and Rancid. They were peripherally involved in the Riot grrrl movement, with Neuman (one of the movement's founders) playing drums for the band. The band disbanded in 1998.

Band members
Christopher Appelgren – singer
Molly Neuman – drums
Carlos Cañedo – guitar
Rop Vaszquez – bass

Discography

Albums

Singles and EPs

Non-album tracks

References

External links
 PeeChees page on Kill Rock Stars website
 Band Discographies on Kill Rock Stars website

Punk rock groups from California
Musical groups from Oakland, California